Christy Ekpukhon Ihunaegbo (born 6 February 1985 in Asaba) is a Nigerian sprinter who specializes in the 400 metres.

Her personal best time is 51.11 seconds, achieved in May 2007 in Brazzaville.

In 2008, she was found guilty of metenolone doping. The sample was delivered on 17 February 2008 in an in-competition test in Leipzig. Ekpukhon received a suspension from March 2008 to March 2010.

Achievements

References

External links

1985 births
Living people
Sportspeople from Delta State
Nigerian female sprinters
Athletes (track and field) at the 2004 Summer Olympics
Olympic athletes of Nigeria
Athletes (track and field) at the 2006 Commonwealth Games
Commonwealth Games silver medallists for Nigeria
Doping cases in athletics
Nigerian sportspeople in doping cases
Commonwealth Games medallists in athletics
African Games gold medalists for Nigeria
African Games medalists in athletics (track and field)
Athletes (track and field) at the 2007 All-Africa Games
Olympic female sprinters
20th-century Nigerian women
21st-century Nigerian women
Medallists at the 2006 Commonwealth Games